Clerc-Carson House is a historic home located at Ripley, Jackson County, West Virginia. It was built about 1880, and is a two-story, asymmetrical, brick dwelling with a "T"-shaped plan in the Italianate style. It features a low hipped roof with wide eaves, eaves brackets and cornice dentils, and the original shutters in working order.

It was listed on the National Register of Historic Places in 1992. It is located in the Ripley Historic District, listed in 2004.

References

Houses on the National Register of Historic Places in West Virginia
Italianate architecture in West Virginia
Houses completed in 1880
Houses in Jackson County, West Virginia
National Register of Historic Places in Jackson County, West Virginia
Individually listed contributing properties to historic districts on the National Register in West Virginia
1880 establishments in West Virginia